Two Japanese destroyers have been named Enoki:

 , an  launched in 1918. She was rerated as a minesweeper and renamed W-10 in 1930 before being stricken in 1936.
 , a  both launched and sunk in 1945

Imperial Japanese Navy ship names
Japanese Navy ship names